The 1981 European Curling Championships were held from 7 to 12 December at the Sportzentrum arena in Grindelwald, Switzerland.

The Swiss men's team skipped by Jürg Tanner won their third European title, and the Swiss women's team skipped by Susan Schlapbach won their second European title.

For the first time, the men's team of Austria and Finland and women's teams of Austria and Luxembourg took part in the European Championship.

Men's

Teams

Round robin
Group A

Group B

  Teams to playoffs

Ranking games for 5th-14th places

Playoffs

Final standings

Women's

Teams

Round robin

Group A

Group B

  Teams to playoffs

Ranking games for 5th-12th places

Playoffs

Final standings

References

European Curling Championships, 1981
European Curling Championships, 1981
European Curling Championships
Curling competitions in Switzerland
International sports competitions hosted by Switzerland
European Curling Championships
European Curling Championships
20th century in Bern